Erik van Dillen (born February 21, 1951) is an American retired tennis player who played over 25 Grand Slam championships at Australian Open, French Open, Wimbledon and US Open.

Tennis career
Born in San Mateo, California, van Dillen first played tennis aged six years old. During his junior career, he won both the singles and doubles competitions at the "USTA Boys 16 & 18 National Championships" in Kalamazoo, Michigan, as well as winning other national titles in the 12- and 14-year-old divisions. In total, he won 12 U.S. junior titles and is the only player ever to win singles and doubles titles in all four age groups: 12, 14, 16, and 18. (Source USTA Yearbooks).

Van Dillen first played on the men's circuit in 1967 when he appeared at the U.S. Championships for the first time. In 1968, he had his first big win when he beat his future doubles partner and then American No. 1 Charlie Pasarell at the U.S. national tournament at Boston in five sets when only 17. He was ranked in the top 20 of the U.S. from 1968 to 1970 and the top 10 from 1971 to 1973.

In 1973, he won his biggest tournament beating Frew McMillan in Nottingham. In 1974, van Dillen had his best Grand Slam singles year reaching the last 16 at the French Open where he narrowly lost to eventual champion Björn Borg in five sets. At Wimbledon, he also reached the last 16, defeating Guillermo Vilas on the way. He repeated the last 16 appearance in Paris in 1975.

In 1978, van Dillen had a very strong grass-court season in England; he qualified at Nottingham and reached the last 16, and also won the doubles with Dick Stockton. At Wimbledon, he again qualified and then had the greatest win of his career defeating John McEnroe in five sets in the first round.

Van Dillen's last full year on the circuit was 1981 when he won two doubles titles and reached the semifinals of the Volvo International in North Conway with Roscoe Tanner. He also reached the semifinals in singles at Newport, Rhode Island.

He completed his career in 1982 by qualifying at his last singles event the prestigious Alan King Classic in Las Vegas and shortly after reached the final of the WCT Invitation event at Forest Hills in doubles with Dick Stockton.

Van Dillen played in the Wimbledon veterans doubles for a number of years and also played in a veterans event at Indian Wells.

Between 1960 and 1981, he beat six of the then-top players: John McEnroe, Stan Smith, Arthur Ashe, Jimmy Connors, Guillermo Vilas, and Ilie Năstase. At his peak, he was ranked 36th in the world in singles, and 35th in doubles.

After tennis
Erik earned a degree in finance from the University of Southern California and an MBA from San Francisco State University. He joined IMG, a sports marketing agency. While at IMG, Erik worked with Joe Montana, Martina Navratilova, Arnold Palmer, Kristi Yamaguchi and Chris Evert and helped to build a number of sport and lifestyle events including the WTA Bank of the West Tennis Classic (formerly the Virginia Slims of Oakland), the US Open of Surfing (a 10-day sports and lifestyle exhibition), the Transamerica Seniors Golf Championship and the Escape from Alcatraz Triathlon.

After the death of Mark McCormack in 2003, Erik left the company to create van Dillen Partners, a sports and lifestyle marketing agency. The agency works with professional sports and media associations; such as the Association of Tennis Professionals (ATP), Women’s Tennis Association (WTA), Association of Volleyball Professionals (AVP), Association of Surfing Professionals (ASP), Stanford University Athletics, ESPN, NBC Sports, Fox Sports Net, ABC Sports and CBS Sports.

Career finals

Doubles (13 wins, 10 losses)

References

External links
 
 
 

American male tennis players
American people of Dutch descent
People from San Mateo, California
Tennis people from California
USC Trojans men's tennis players
1951 births
Living people